Mushkan (also Romanized as Mūshkān) is a village in Zanjireh Rural District, in the Shabab District of Chardavol County, Ilam Province, Iran. At the 2006 census, its population was 196, in 45 families. The village is populated by Kurds.

References 

Populated places in Chardavol County
Kurdish settlements in Ilam Province